Classic is a 1998 Russian action film directed by Georgy Shengeliya.

Plot 
The film is set in 1990s in Russia, starting with the billiard masters club raising funds to build a luxury retirement home for their teachers: the previous generation of billiard players, now elderly. A crime lord Savitsky is among those asked for the $20,000 share (in 1998, a very serious sum, unobtainable for most people), which he begrudgingly grants, but then sends his goons after the couriers and steals the entire sum for himself. Surviving courier proposes to take the money back by force to his Moscow superiors, but those decide to outwit Savitsky instead.

Soon, Savitsky's home city receives word from the capital that they are about to be visited by a master player known only as the Classic who will challenge Savitsky to a duel with an $150,000 bet. Savitsky decides to play along but cheat in order to win at any cost. To obtain the money, he contacts his old business partner, signing up for a loan that, if not paid back, will force him to give up his entire criminal network.

Indeed, an elderly player Gorsky arrives soon with his bodyguard Yuri, claiming to be a famous writer who can afford such a bet. Witnessing his skills with the cue, as well as his characteristic knowledge of the classic literature (thus the codename), Savitsky concludes that Gorsky must be the Classic, and accepts the challenge. As special precautions, they agree on the rules: refusal to play counts as a loss, and the arbiter of the duel shall be a known crime lord known as Monarch.

A day before the duel, Savitsky sends hitmen to break Gorsky's right arm, staging an assault on his fiancee. They succeed, and Savitsky then sends his spy Lily to seduce Yuri and find out of the duo's further plans. Crippled Gorsky says that now Yuri will have to play in his stead, using special magnetic balls that can be directed using a remote control. Learning of this, Savitsky disarms the system, seemingly assuring his victory.

In the morning, Gorsky requests that Yuri plays in his place, which Monarch allows. To everyone's surprise, Yuri wins the party flawlessly, without even granting his opponent a turn, and reveals that he is the true Classic, having hidden his identity due to Savitsky's likely cheating. Impressed, Monarch gives him the prize and leaves. When the shootout is about to begin, Gorsky reveals a hidden revolver and disarms his opponents, also revealing that he is ambidextrous and unrivaled with a gun. The two escape into Moscow, leaving Savitsky to pay back his debts with his entire fortune.

In Moscow, the retirement home is opened soon. The film concludes with the club's eldest and most respected player Vasiliy being given an honor of the first party, which he begins with a perfect move despite his shaking hands.

Cast 
 Sergey Nikonenko as Gorsky
 Juozas Budraitis as Savitsky
 Aleksei Guskov as Yura
 Valentina Telichkina as Irina
 Lidiya Velezheva as Lilya
 Aleksandr Pankratov-Chyorny as Vitya
 Vladimir Etush as Monarch
 Vladimir Zeldin as Vasiliy 
 Yevgeni Serov as Finish
 Valery Barinov as mansion owner

Accolades

References

External links 
 

1998 films
1990s Russian-language films
1990s crime action films
Russian crime action films
Films set in Russia

Mosfilm films
Films about gambling